Glenn G. Reese (born January 6, 1942 in Greenville, South Carolina) is a former Democratic member of the South Carolina Senate, representing the 11th District based out of Spartanburg County, South Carolina.

Early life and education
Reese is the son of Wilford William and Geneva Rose Reese. He was born in Greenville, South Carolina and attended Chapman High School. He received his associate degree from Mars Hill College, his bachelor's from Auburn University and his master's from Converse College.

South Carolina Senate
Reese was elected to the South Carolina Senate in 1990. He serves on the Banking and Insurance, Ethics, Finance, General, Invitations, Labor, Commerce and Industry and Rules committees.

1998 race for Congress
Reese took 40 percent of the vote to DeMint's 57 percent. To date, he is the last reasonably well-funded Democrat to run in the district since Liz J. Patterson was unseated by Bob Inglis in 1992, and the only Democrat since then to clear the 40 percent mark. He did not have to give up his state senate seat to run for Congress; South Carolina state senate terms run concurrently with that of the President of the United States, and Reese was not up for reelection again until 2000.

Sports official
Reese has also worked as a sports official. He has worked as a High School Sports Official in football, basketball & baseball. He officiated Division I NCAA basketball for 15 years in the Southern Conference. He's also officiated five national college championships in basketball, in four foreign countries: Soviet Union, Poland, Austria & Germany and at the Good-Will Game Trials in 1986.

References

External links
South Carolina Legislature - Senator Glenn G. Reese official SC Senate website
Project Vote Smart - Senator Glenn G. Reese (SC) profile
Follow the Money - Glenn G. Reese
2006 2004 2002 2000 1996 campaign contributions

Democratic Party South Carolina state senators
Democratic Party members of the South Carolina House of Representatives
1942 births
Living people
Politicians from Greenville, South Carolina
21st-century American politicians